William Harris Howton (born July 3, 1930) is a former American football player, an end in the National Football League (NFL) for 12 seasons with the Green Bay Packers, Cleveland Browns, and expansion Dallas Cowboys.

As a rookie, Howton caught thirteen touchdown passes, a rookie record that was tied but not broken until 1998. Howton caught a total 503 career passes for a total of 8,459 yards. In doing so, he surpassed then leader Don Hutson to become the all-time leader in receptions and yardage. This made him the first receiver with 500 catches in pro football history. In over a half century since Howton's retirement, the dawn of improved passing has seen him drop into the top 50.  

Despite his extensive credentials, he has yet to be named a finalist or semifinalist in Pro Football Hall of Fame balloting. He retired after the 1963 season, after four years with Dallas.  In 2004, he was named to the Professional Football Researchers Association Hall of Very Good in the association's second HOVG class.

Early years
Howton attended Plainview High School, where he lettered in football, basketball, and track and field.

Howton played college football at Rice Institute in Houston, where he was nicknamed "Red Fox" not only for his hair color, but also for the way he ran pass patterns, which made him a great offensive end, establishing a season record for average yards (22.6) on pass receptions.

At the 1948 track and field regional meet in Lubbock, he had a time of 14.3 in the high hurdle event, setting a record that stood for several decades.  In 1951, he won the high hurdle event in a track meet against the Texas A&M Aggies. He was also a notable runner in the low hurdles.

In 1951, he finished his college football career with 64 catches for 1,289 yards and 12 touchdowns, on his way to earn the following honors:
 All-America.
 Southwest Conference MVP.
 All-SWC team.
 Won the George Martin Award for the second straight year (he also won it in 1950), which is given to Rice's most valuable football player.
 Played in the East–West Shrine Game.
 Played in the College All-Star Game in Chicago in August 1952.

In 1971, he was inducted into the Rice Athletic Hall of Fame.

Professional career

Green Bay Packers
Howton was selected in the second round of the 1952 NFL draft, 15th overall, by the Green Bay Packers. As a rookie, he earned immediate comparisons with Hall of amer Don Hutson, with his speed, sure hands, and big-play ability. He established himself as one of the best wide receivers in the NFL, with a league-leading 1,231 receiving yards. He also set a rookie record with 13 touchdowns, which would last until 1965 when the total number was broken by Gale Sayers. His touchdown reception mark lasted until 1998, when it was broken by Randy Moss.

Howton became one of the most successful wide receivers in Packers history, while playing seven seasons in losing teams (26–56–2).
During his seven years in Green Bay, he led his teams in receiving yards for six straight seasons (1952–57), led the league in receiving yards two times (1952 and 1956) and touchdown receptions once (1956). He caught 303 passes for 5,581 yards with an 18.4 yard average, scored 43 touchdowns and earned All-Pro in two seasons (1956–57) and Pro Bowl honors in four seasons (1952 and 1955–57).

He caught 13 touchdown passes in his 1952 rookie season.  In his fifth season in 1956, Howton caught seven passes for a total of 257 yards against the Los Angeles Rams.

He set team records that still stand today:
 Most receiving yards by a rookie with 1,231 yards in 1952
 Highest yardage game with 257 yards against the Los Angeles Rams in 1956.
 Two 200-plus receiving games - the only Packer receiver aside from Don Hutson, with four, to have more than one.

Howton was named the Packers' player representative and president of the NFL Players Association in 1958, and played a major role in establishing a pension fund for players, which was a debated topic with club owners at the time.

In January 1959, the Packers hired Vince Lombardi as head coach and general manager after the team's worst record ever (1–10–1) in 1958. In April, Lombardi traded Howton to the Cleveland Browns in exchange for defensive end Bill Quinlan and halfback Lew Carpenter. Lombardi desired receivers who could block, which was not Howton's strength.

Through the years, there has been speculation that his NFL Players Association ties were the real reason behind the trade.

Howton was inducted into the Green Bay Packers Hall of Fame in 1974.

Cleveland Browns
Howton played only one season in Cleveland, leading the team in receptions with 39, and experiencing what would be the only winning campaign of his NFL career. At the start of the 1960 season, he notified the Browns his intentions to retire.

The expansion Dallas Cowboys convinced him to play in his home state and traded a draft choice to the Browns in exchange for his rights.

Dallas Cowboys
Howton was acquired by the expansion Dallas Cowboys in 1960. That season the Cowboys recorded only a tie, which came against the New York Giants at Yankee Stadium on December 4, when a late touchdown pass from Eddie LeBaron to Howton finalized a 31–31 comeback, against a team that had made championship game appearances in three of the previous four years. Following the season, Howton signed a three-year contract.

The first win in franchise history came during the 1961 season opener against the Pittsburgh Steelers, 27–24, with Howton contributing a game-high 138 receiving yards and a touchdown.

During his time with the Cowboys, Howton remained a key starter in a league-leading offense, that was composed by Eddie LeBaron, Don Meredith, Don Perkins, Frank Clarke, Dick Bielski, and Lee Folkins. He led the Cowboys in receiving in 1961 (with a career-high of 56 catches) and again in 1962.

On September 29, 1963, Howton became the NFL's all-time receiving leader, after breaking Don Hutson's record for career receptions and receiving yards. He retired after playing in 12 seasons with 503 catches, 8,459 yards and 61 touchdowns. Howton was also the top receiver from those players in the 1952 NFL draft including hall of famers Frank Gifford, Ollie Matson, and Hugh McElhenny.  His 61 TDs are only two less than leader Matson.

References

External links

1930 births
Living people
People from Littlefield, Texas
Players of American football from Texas
American football wide receivers
Rice Owls football players
Dallas Cowboys players
Green Bay Packers players
Western Conference Pro Bowl players
Presidents of the National Football League Players Association
Trade unionists from Texas